Noah Diliberto (born 8 September 2001) is a French professional footballer who plays as a midfielder for Ligue 2 club Valenciennes.

Career
Diliberto made his professional debut with Valenciennes in a 1–0 Ligue 2 win over Orléans on 22 November 2019.

References

External links
 
 UNFP Profile

2001 births
Living people
People from Cambrai
Sportspeople from Nord (French department)
French footballers
Footballers from Hauts-de-France
Association football midfielders
Ligue 2 players
Championnat National 3 players
Valenciennes FC players